Thecobathra anas is a moth in the family Yponomeutidae. It was described by Stringer in 1930. It is found in Korea, Japan and Indonesia.

The wingspan is 12–18 mm. Adults are silvery
white.

The larvae feed on Castanopsis cuspidata, Quercus glauca and Quercus serrata.

References

Moths described in 1930
Yponomeutidae